Simon Bachmann (born 17 February 1999) is a Seychellois swimmer.

Career 

Bachmann competed in the 2019 Indian Ocean Island Games and won a gold medal in the 100 m butterfly competition. He competed in the 1,500 m freestyle in the 2020 Summer Olympics.

References

1999 births
Living people
Sportspeople from Nice
Swimmers at the 2020 Summer Olympics
Seychellois male swimmers
Olympic swimmers of Seychelles
African Games competitors for Seychelles
Swimmers at the 2019 African Games
Swimmers at the 2022 Commonwealth Games
Commonwealth Games competitors for Seychelles
20th-century Seychellois people
21st-century Seychellois people